Branco Bewinn Nazeem du Preez (born 8 May 1990) is a former South African rugby union player, playing with the South Africa national rugby sevens team. He is a utility back, but usually plays as a scrum-half for the Blitzbokke. Du Preez retired as the most capped South African Rugby Sevens player.

Career

Youth

Du Preez was born in George, South Africa. He played high school rugby for PW Botha College in George, which earned him a call-up to the South Western Districts side that played at the Under-16 Grant Khomo Week tournament in 2006.

He represented them at the premier high school tournament in South Africa, the Under-18 Craven Week, in both 2007 and 2008. He also represented the  side in the 2007 and 2008 Under-19 Provincial Championships.

When he finished schooling, he moved to Pretoria before the 2009 season.

He was also selected in the South African Under-20 squad that played at the 2010 IRB Junior World Championship in Argentina. He came on as a substitute in their first match against Tonga in a 40–14 win, started their second match against Scotland at outside centre, helping them to a 73–0 win and once again appeared as a substitute in their final pool match, a 35–42 defeat to Australia. The team qualified for the semi-finals of the competition, but were soundly beaten by New Zealand, losing 7–36 despite Du Preez scoring a try for the Baby Boks just before half-time. He was an unused replacement for their third-place play-off match against England, which South Africa won 27–22.

He returned to domestic action for the  during the 2010 Under-21 Provincial Championship, making four appearances.

South African Sevens

At the start of 2010, Du Preez became involved with the South African Sevens team. He made his debut for them at the 2010 Wellington Sevens leg of the 2009–10 IRB Sevens World Series. He also appeared at the events in the USA, Australia and Hong Kong before playing in the 2010 IRB Junior World Championship.

Over the next few years, he became a regular on the Sevens World Series circuit. He took part in eight events in both the 2010–11 and 2011–12 seasons.

His 2012–13 was curtailed through injury, playing in just four events, but he did return to play in the 2013 Rugby World Cup Sevens, where the Blitzbokke lost in the Quarter Finals of the competition to Fiji.

He played in eight legs of the 2013–14 IRB Sevens World Series and was then included in the squad that played at the 2014 Commonwealth Games in Glasgow. He helped his side all the way to the final, where they got a 17–12 victory over a New Zealand that won the previous four tournaments.

References

External links 
 

South African rugby union players
Living people
1990 births
People from George, South Africa
Rugby union scrum-halves
Rugby union fly-halves
Rugby union centres
Rugby union wings
Rugby union fullbacks
South Africa international rugby sevens players
South Africa Under-20 international rugby union players
Rugby sevens players at the 2014 Commonwealth Games
Rugby sevens players at the 2018 Commonwealth Games
Commonwealth Games gold medallists for South Africa
Commonwealth Games rugby sevens players of South Africa
Tshwane University of Technology alumni
Commonwealth Games medallists in rugby sevens
Rugby sevens players at the 2020 Summer Olympics
Olympic rugby sevens players of South Africa
Golden Lions players
Medallists at the 2014 Commonwealth Games